Solo Star is the debut studio album by American singer Solange, released by Columbia Records and Music World on December 26, 2002 in Japan and January 21, 2003 in the United States. It debuted and peaked at number forty-nine on the U.S. Billboard 200 and number twenty-three on the Top R&B/Hip-Hop Albums in early February 2003. The album produced two singles: "Feelin' You" (featuring N.O.R.E.) and "Crush" (later renamed to "Don't Fight the Feeling"). "Feelin' You" reached no. 73 on the Billboard Hot R&B/Hip Hop Songs chart.

Critical reception

William Ruhlmann of AllMusic gave the album three out of five stars saying: "Executive producer [Mathew] Knowles has surrounded Solange with a bevy of trendy writer/producers, including The Underdogs, Platinum Status, Timbaland, The Neptunes and Rockwilder, along with such guest stars as B2K and Lil' Romeo. The result is a state-of-the-art contemporary R&B album full of big beats, catchy choruses, and gimmicky production effects. But the nominal star of the show is lost somewhere in the mix. It doesn't help that the 16-year-old has a thin, undeveloped voice that is easily overwhelmed. Slant Magazine gave two out of five stars, saying: "The largely synthetic-sounding Solo Star follows the growing industry standard in which the focus is on production rather songwriting", also adding that Solange's voice is uncannily similar to Beyoncé's.

Release and promotion
The album was released in December 2002 in Japan, while it was released in United States following month. It under-performed in the United States, selling 112,000 copies according to Nielsen SoundScan, and dropped off the chart five weeks after its debut. The only two singles released from the album, the N.O.R.E.-featured "Feelin' You (Part II)" and the Neptunes-produced "Crush" (also known as "Don't Fight the Feeling"), failed to chart on the Billboard Hot 100. The album is no longer in print and the online music website iTunes does not sell the album. A re-recording of "Crush", with vastly different instrumental and harmonies and featuring Papa Reu, was included on the movie soundtrack for The Fighting Temptations which stars Solange's sister Beyoncé. This re-recording was renamed "Don't Fight the Feeling" to match the movie poster's tagline. The album was promoted with the Solo Star Tour in 2003.

Track listing 

Note: tracks 17, 18 and 19 are four seconds of silence each with these bonus tracks following:

Sample credits
"True Love" contains replayed elements from "So Amazing" by Luther Vandross
"Thinkin' About You" contains replayed elements from "Scooby Doo Where Are You" by Joseph Barbera, William Hanna, and Hoyt Curtin

2006 re-release
Solo Star was re-released in November 2006 with a different artwork and track listing. The reissue album contained twelve tracks: seven tracks from 2002 standard release, four remixes and previously unreleased track titled "Bring It on Home". There is a newly recorded version of "Feelin' You" which features American rapper Slim Thug. Both singles from the album were remixed. "Crush" was remixed by Vibelicious. Also, a duet with Beyoncé featuring Da Brat titled "Naïve" was remixed by Maurice Joshua.

Personnel
Solange Knowles – composer, primary artist, producer, vocal producer
Ketrina Askew – composer
B2K – featured artist, guest artist, primary artist
Rich Balmer – engineer
Joseph Barbera – composer
Beyoncé Knowles – producer
Bruce Buechner – engineer
William Burke – programming
Skip Burrow – engineer
Kandi Burruss – producer
Kim Burse – A&R
Scott Gusty Christensen – engineer
Cedric Courtois – producer
John Czornyj – mixing
Myke Diesel – engineer, mixing, producer
Jimmy Douglass – mixing
Erica Dymakkus – backing vocals 
Damon Elliott – drum programming, engineer, keyboards, percussion, producer
Brian Garten – engineer
Serban Ghenea – mixing
Dabling Harward – recording
A. Jackson – composer
Alonzo Jackson – producer
Troy Johnson – composer, engineer, producer
Jerome Jones – composer
Talib Kareem – producer
Mathew Knowles – executive producer
Emily Lazar – mastering
Murphy Lee – featured artist, primary artist
Lil' Romeo – guest artist, primary artist
Tony Maserati – mixing
Master P – composer
Michael McClain – producer
Ramon Morales – engineer
N.O.R.E. – composer, guest artist, primary artist
Huy Nguyen – A&R assistance, artist coordination
Tony Oliver – composer
Kevin Parker – mixing
Mark Penn – producer
Dave Pensado – mixing
Linda Perry – producer
Platinum Status – producer
Rockwilder – composer, producer
Dexter Simmons – mixing
Slim Thug – primary artist
Chris Stokes – producer
Timbaland – mixing, producer
Luther Vandross – composer

Charts

Release history

References

2002 debut albums
Columbia Records albums
Solange Knowles albums
Albums produced by Timbaland
Albums produced by the Neptunes
Albums produced by Linda Perry
Albums produced by Jermaine Dupri
Albums produced by Rockwilder